5900 Jensen, provisional designation , is a dark Lixiaohua asteroid from the outer regions of the asteroid belt, approximately 19 kilometers in diameter. It was discovered on 3 October 1986, by Danish astronomer Poul Jensen at the Brorfelde Observatory in Denmark. The asteroid was named for the discoverer and his wife Bodil Jensen.

Orbit and classification 

Jensen is a member of the Lixiaohua family, an outer-belt asteroid family with more than 700 known members, consisting of C-type and X-type asteroids. The family's namesake is 3556 Lixiaohua.

It orbits the Sun in the outer main-belt at a distance of 2.5–3.8 AU once every 5 years and 7 months (2,045 days). Its orbit has an eccentricity of 0.21 and an inclination of 9° with respect to the ecliptic.

The body's observation arc begins also at Lowell Observatory, with a precovery taken two days before its first identification, and 56 years prior to its official discovery observation at Brorfelde.

Physical characteristics

Diameter and albedo 

According to the survey carried out by the NEOWISE mission of NASA's Wide-field Infrared Survey Explorer, Jensen measures 19.934 kilometers in diameter  and its surface has an albedo of 0.030.

Rotation period 

As of 2017, no rotational lightcurve of Jensen has been obtained from photometric observations. The asteroid's rotation period, poles and shape remains unknown.

Naming 

This minor planet was named in honor of the discoverer and his wife, Paul and Bodil Jensen. The name was proposed by his colleges Karl Augustesen and Hans Jørn Fogh Olsen. Jensen worked for 35 years in the Meridian Circle Department at the discovering Brorfelde Observatory, and also participated at the observatories minor-planet program using its Schmidt telescope.

The official naming citation was published by the Minor Planet Center on 22 July 1994.

References

External links 
 Asteroid Lightcurve Database (LCDB), query form (info )
 Dictionary of Minor Planet Names, Google books
 Asteroids and comets rotation curves, CdR – Observatoire de Genève, Raoul Behrend
 Discovery Circumstances: Numbered Minor Planets (5001)-(10000) – Minor Planet Center
 
 

005900
Discoveries by Poul Jensen (astronomer)
Named minor planets
19861003